is a Japanese football player for Nara Club.

Club statistics
Updated to 24 February 2019.

References

External links
Profile at Matsumoto Yamaga

1985 births
Living people
Ryutsu Keizai University alumni
Association football people from Ibaraki Prefecture
Japanese footballers
J1 League players
J2 League players
Japan Football League players
Tokyo Verdy players
Matsumoto Yamaga FC players
FC Maruyasu Okazaki players
Nara Club players
Association football defenders